Tadmit is a small town and commune in Djelfa Province, Algeria. According to the 1998 census it has a population of 6,172. Tadmit is something of a secluded town, although it is located several kilometres southwest of Djelfa. It is accessed via a small road off the N1 Trans-Saharan Highway.

History

Antiquity
Guénin, in his "Notice sur les ruines de Tadmit", points out that Tadmit was once a fairly important centre of occupation. The author describes numerous ruins of towns, villages, posts and defensive enclosures - without being able to attribute them to the Romans or the Berbers. There is no characteristic external evidence to establish the origin of the ruins at Tadmit; only the word et Tadmit would indicate by its sound that the Berbers occupied this point. 
However, as the Romans had established themselves in Messaâd (located in the same valley), and the ruins of Messaâd would resemble those of Tadmit, it would be possible that a Roman colony had come to settle in Tadmit. The remains of the ancient occupation are very visible. On the site of the [former] penitentiary a village was built; on the opposite bank of the 0ued-Tadmit there were traces of a real town. Both would have been stretched out by a real oppidum with a double enclosure wall, and the passes were guarded by reductions or by a kind of tower. Upstream from the bridge on the Takarzane road, there are still traces of isolated constructions; a square enclosure of about 100 metres on each side, and on both banks of the river, posts intended to protect the low-lying area where the inhabitants of the towns had established their crops.

During the french colonisation
A penitentiary for "natives" was created in 1885, and it was in service at least until 1916, as a prefectoral instruction points out. During the summer of 1908, "a serious epidemic of exanthematic typhus" (65 men affected and 7 deaths out of a total of 103 inmates) raged. According to Sylvie Thénault the penitentiary at Tadmit "was at the top of the hierarchy of hardship"; it was also called "the hell of Jebel-Amour", according to the newspaper Le Radical..

Following a study conducted in 1918 in the Djelfa region, it was decided to set up a sheep breeding station in Tadmit in 1922, in the former penitentiary. The initial flock consisted of 600 animals, which was reduced to 250 by selection. Ten years later, the flock consisted of more than 2200 animals. The station allowed the selection and breeding of the breeds known as "Tadmit" (which is distinguished by the fineness of its wool), the variety known as "Raimbi" and that of "Zahrez".

References

Communes of Djelfa Province
Cities in Algeria
Algeria